"Mistaken Identity" is a song written by Billy Mann and Delta Goodrem. It was produced and co-written by Mann for Goodrem's second album, Mistaken Identity (2004). The song was released in Australia as the album's second single on 17 January 2005 as a CD single, and peaked at number seven on the Australian Singles Chart, breaking her run of six consecutive number-one singles.

History
"Mistaken Identity" opens with lyrics about Goodrem's cancer ordeal and how it changed her outlook on life. During the chorus, Goodrem sings, "The girl I used to be has a terrible case of mistaken identity, yesterday's girl is not what you see, it's a terrible case of mistaken identity". Lyrically, the song is darker, harsher, and edgier than Goodrem's previous recordings, and is written in a nine-eight time signature. Goodrem admitted that she had to fight the record company for it to be released.

The single was not as successful as Goodrem's previous releases and ended her streak of six consecutive number ones on the Australian charts when it debuted and peaked at number seven in January 2005. It was certified gold but quickly fell down the charts, spending only seven weeks in the top 50.

Track listing
Australian CD single
 "Mistaken Identity" – 4:02
 "Silence Be Heard" – 4:23
 "How a Dream Looks" – 4:21
 "Mistaken Identity" (video) – 4:09

Charts

Certifications

References

External links
Song Lyrics

2004 songs
2005 singles
Daylight Records singles
Delta Goodrem songs
Epic Records singles
Songs written by Billy Mann
Songs written by Delta Goodrem

it:Mistaken Identity (singolo)